John Grill AO (born 1945) was the founder and chief executive officer of Australian-based engineering company, Worley.

Biography
He graduated with Honours in Civil Engineering from the University of Sydney before joining Esso Australia in 1968. Grill then moved in 1971 to be Chief Executive of Wholohan Grill and Partners, a civil engineering firm. This specialised consulting practice acquired the business of Worley Engineering in 1987.

Worley Group Limited listed on the Australian Stock Exchange in November 2002 and Grill is the company's largest shareholder.

In 2004, Worley Group Limited acquired Parsons E&C Corporation, a US-based global project services company, and in time amalgamated with various other parties to form WorleyParsons.

An engineer by profession, the notoriously media shy Grill is nevertheless very well respected in engineering circles. He was named Engineers Australia Professional Engineer of the Year 2006.

Grill retired as WorleyParsons CEO in October 2012 and became its chairman in February 2013.

Upon his retirement as CEO, Grill donated $20 million to the University of Sydney to establish the John Grill Centre for Project Leadership.

In January 2014, Grill was appointed an Officer of the Order of Australia for distinguished service to engineering and to business, to the minerals, energy and power supply industries and as a supporter of advanced education and training.

Fortune
Forbes 2006 listed John Grill as #1014 with a net worth of US$1.01 billion. This estimates him as the 19th richest man in Australia and New Zealand.

In a March 2008 ranking of Business Review Weeklys richest Australian executives and managers, John Grill was placed as #8 with a 2007 value of A$861.6 million and total remuneration of $2.59 million.

However, on 5 April 2008, it was reported that John Grill is among Australia's richest executives to be most affected by the global financial turmoil, suffering an estimated share value loss of $585 million.

References

1946 births
Australian chief executives
Living people
Australian billionaires
Businesspeople from Sydney
Fellows of the Australian Academy of Technological Sciences and Engineering
University of Sydney alumni